WBSU-TV is a public-access cable television station owned and operated by Ball State University in Muncie, Indiana.

Ball State University